Paint the Sky with Stars: The Best of Enya is the first greatest hits album by Irish singer, songwriter and musician Enya, released on 1997 by WEA. Following her worldwide promotional tour in support of her previous album The Memory of Trees (1995), Enya began selecting tracks for a compilation album in early 1997, as her recording contract with WEA permitted her to do so. The album contains songs from her debut album Enya (1987) to The Memory of Trees (1995) and two new tracks, "Paint the Sky with Stars"  and "Only If...".

Paint the Sky with Stars received positive reviews from critics and was a commercial success, reaching number four in the United Kingdom and number 30 on the Billboard 200 in the United States. In the latter territory, the album continued to sell over the next eight years, reaching four million copies shipped in 2005. In Japan, it became the first non-Japanese album under the Warner label to receive a Japan Gold Disc Award in the Grand Prix Album category for selling over one million copies. To promote the compilation album, Enya made several interviews and televised performances.

Critical reception
Paint the Sky with Stars received universal acclaim from music critics. Stephen Thomas Erlewine from AllMusic rated the album five stars out of five and says that Paint the Sky with Stars: The Best of Enya is an excellent 16-song overview of Enya's career, containing 14 selections from The Celts, Watermark, Shepherd Moons, and The Memory of Trees—including "Caribbean Blue", "Anywhere Is", "Marble Halls", "Book of Days" and, of course, "Orinoco Flow"—as well as two previously unreleased songs ("Only If...", "Paint the Sky with Stars") that fit comfortably with her past work.

Track listing
All lyrics written by Roma Ryan, except for "Marble Halls", all music composed by Enya and all songs produced by Nicky Ryan.

Singles
"Only If..." was also released as a single the same year with the previously unreleased "Willows on the Water" along with the Oíche Chiúin ("Silent Night") as accompanying tracks.

"Boadicea" was sampled by The Fugees on their UK No. 1 hit "Ready or Not"; it was also sampled by Mario Winans on his UK No. 1 and US No. 2 hit "I Don't Wanna Know".

Production
Produced by Nicky Ryan
Arranged by Enya and Nicky Ryan
Lyrics by Roma Ryan
Marble Halls (Traditional) arranged by Enya and Nicky Ryan
All tracks published by EMI Songs Ltd
Principal photography: David Scheinmann
Calligraphy and Design: Brody Neuenschwander
Mastered by Arun

Accolades

Japan Gold Disc Awards 

|-
|  style="width:35px; text-align:center;"| 1998 || Paint the Sky with Stars  || Best International Pop Albums of the Year|| 
|-

Charts

Weekly charts

Year-end charts

Certifications and sales

Release history

See also 
 List of best-selling albums in Brazil

References

External links

Enya compilation albums
1997 greatest hits albums
Reprise Records compilation albums